The 1907 Yale Bulldogs football team was an American football team that represented Yale University as an independent during the 1907 college football season. The team finished with a 9–0–1 record, shut out nine of ten opponents, and outscored all opponents by a total of 208 to 10. William F. Knox was the head coach, and Lucius Horatio Bigelow was the team captain.

There was no contemporaneous system in 1907 for determining a national champion. However, Yale was retroactively named as the national champion by the Billingsley Report, Caspar Whitney, the Helms Athletic Foundation, the Houlgate System, the National Championship Foundation, and Parke H. Davis.

Four Yale players were selected as consensus first-team players on the 1907 All-America team. The team's consensus All-Americans were: quarterback Tad Jones; fullback Ted Coy; end Clarence Alcott; and tackle Lucius Horatio Biglow.

Schedule

References

Yale
Yale Bulldogs football seasons
College football national champions
College football undefeated seasons
Yale Bulldogs football